Misaki Doi was the defending champion, but she chose to participate at the 2015 Nürnberger Versicherungscup instead.

Riko Sawayanagi won the title, defeating Jang Su-jeong in the final, 6–4, 6–4.

Seeds

Main draw

Finals

Top half

Bottom half

References 
 Main draw

Lecoq Seoul Open - Singles